The Rabbi Jacob Joseph School is an Orthodox Jewish day school located in Staten Island, New York that serves students from nursery through twelfth grade, with another branch in Edison, New Jersey. The school was founded in 1903 by Rabbi Shmuel Yitzchok Andron and named in honor of Rabbi Jacob Joseph, chief rabbi of New York City's Association of American Orthodox Hebrew Congregations.

After Rabbi Andron's death, his son Raphael and Samuel I. Andron obtained a charter from the New York Board of Regents in 1903 to establish a school in his name. The Rabbi Jacob Joseph School was known for its rigorous Talmudic curriculum and remains open to students from nursery age through the twelfth grade.

Its founders originally established the school on Manhattan's Orchard Street in the Lower East Side  . It moved to Henry Street in 1907, and expanded to a second building in 1914. Lazarus Joseph (1891–1966), grandson of Rabbi Jacob Joseph, and NY State Senator and New York City Comptroller, played an active role as a board member in the school.

1969-present
In 1969, it stopped its younger grades. Enrollment was low, and the neighborhood had become rough. In 1972, it made plans to open a new campus in Riverdale, but ultimately, in 1976, the school moved to the Richmondtown area of Staten Island, where it maintained the boys' school campus until 2017 (they then moved to Amboy Rd); a girls division of the elementary school was established in Staten Island's Graniteville section. In 1982, a boys high school branch and Beis Medrash was opened in Edison, New Jersey.

Although the school ("RJJ") is no longer an "advanced" yeshiva, it "produced hundred of rabbis and community leaders in the late 1940s, the 1950s and the 1960s, and was also an important feeder school for the Lakewood yeshiva, Beis Medrash Govoha".

The school also produces a semi-annual scholarly publication, the Journal of Halacha and Contemporary Society ("The RJJ Journal"), edited by one of its rabbinic alumni. The purpose of the Journal is to "study the major questions facing Jews... through the prism of Torah values," and "explore the relevant biblical and Talmudic passages and survey the halakhic literature including the most recent responsa. The Journal does not in any way seek to present itself as the halachic authority on any question, but hopes rather to inform the Jewish public of the positions taken by rabbinic leaders over the generations."

Rabbi Dr. Marvin Schick served for over 30 years as the (unpaid) President of RJJ until his death in 2020; he had succeeded Irving Bunim.

Notable alumni
Robert Aumann (born 1930), recipient of the Nobel Memorial Prize in Economic Sciences in 2005.
Ari L. Goldman (born 1949), author and former religion reporter for The New York Times.
Louis Henkin (1923-2010), human rights law scholar.
Rabbi Chaim Pinchas Scheinberg (1910-2012), founder and head of Torah Ore yeshiva in the Kiryat Mattersdorf neighborhood of Jerusalem, Israel, world-renowned educator and decisor of Jewish law, and member of Moetzes Gedolei HaTorah of Israel.
Sheldon Silver (1944-2022), Former Speaker of the New York State Assembly.
Rabbi Meir Stern, rosh yeshiva of Passaic
Rabbi Moshe Hillel Hirsch, rosh yeshiva of Slabodka 
Marvin Hier (born 1939), founder of the Simon Wiesenthal Center
Meir Zlotowitz, (1943-2017), founder of Artscroll publications.
Tzvi Hersh Weinreb (born 1940), Executive Vice President Emeritus of the Orthodox Union.
Rabbi Mordechai Willig (born 1947), Rosh Yeshiva of RIETS.
Rabbi Reuven Bulka (1944–2021), recipient of the Order of Canada and Rabbi Emeritus of Congregation Machzikei Hadas.

References

External links
 Yeshiva Merkaz Hatorah of Staten Island

Jews and Judaism in Staten Island
Universities and colleges in Staten Island
Jewish day schools in New York (state)
Modern Orthodox Jewish day schools in the United States
Modern Orthodox Judaism in New Jersey
1903 establishments in New York City
Educational institutions established in 1903
Education in Manhattan
Private elementary schools in Staten Island